The discography of Kid Ink, an American rapper, consists of four studio albums, three extended plays, eight mixtapes and thirty-six singles (including sixteen as a featured artist).

After releasing his first mixtape, World Tour, under the name Rockstar, he started to gain popularity. At the beginning of the 2011 summer, he then released his second mixtape, Daydreamer, which was available for download on various sites that featured Cory Gunz, Maejor Ali, Ray J, Sean Kingston, Meek Mill, Bow Wow, along with others.

In September 2011, he released his third mixtape named Wheels Up that featured artists 2 Chainz, Nipsey Hussle, Tyga and more.

In 2012, he was a featured artist in the 2012 XXL Freshman class along with artists such as rappers Future and Macklemore. Kid Ink released his first independent album, Up & Away on June 12, 2012 to moderate success. The album was produced by Ned Cameron and Jahlil Beats among others. It peaked at number 20 on the US Billboard 200 in its first week. The album's first single, "Time of Your Life" preceded the album's release in early 2012 followed by the album's second single, "Lost in the Sauce". On November 21, 2012 Kid Ink released his fifth mixtape, Rocketshipshawty.

On January 4, 2013, he announced that he had signed a deal with RCA Records and premiered his first major label single, titled "Bad Ass" featuring Wale and Meek Mill and produced by Devin Cruise. The song would be released for digital download on January 22, 2013. It has since peaked at number 90 on the Billboard Hot 100 and number 27 on the Hot R&B/Hip-Hop Songs chart. On May 14, he announced his first project released under RCA, would be an EP titled Almost Home on May 28, 2013. It featured artists such as French Montana, Wale, Meek Mill, ASAP Ferg and Rico Love among others. Upon its release, the EP debuted at  number 27 on the Billboard 200. It also produced the single "Money and the Power" which has been featured in HBO's Hard Knocks as well as in the sports video game NBA Live 14. On September 17, 2013, he released the first single from his second studio album My Own Lane, entitled "Show Me" featuring Chris Brown and produced by DJ Mustard. On November 4, 2013, he revealed that My Own Lane would be released on January 7, 2014.

Albums

Studio albums

Commercial mixtapes

Mixtapes

Extended plays

Singles

As lead artist

As featured artist

Promotional singles

Other charted songs

Guest appearances

Production discography

2008
Nipsey Hussle – Bullets Ain't Got No Names Vol. 1
01. "Bullets Ain't Got No Names"

2011
Diddy – Dirty Money – LoveLove vs. HateLove
03. "Sade"

Notes

References

External links
 Official website
 Kid Ink at AllMusic

Discographies of American artists
Hip hop discographies